The women's 400 metres hurdles at the 2006 European Athletics Championships were held at the Ullevi on August 7, August 8 and August 9.

Iakovákis and Plawgo were well ahead of the field, while Williams surged towards the finish line and pipped Frenchman Naman Keïta by a hundredth.

Medalists

Schedule

Results

Round 1
Qualification: First 3 in each heat (Q) and the next 4 fastest (q) advance to the semifinals.

Semifinals
First 4 of each Semifinal will be directly qualified (Q) for the Final.

Semifinal 1

Semifinal 2

Final

External links
Results

Hurdles 400
400 metres hurdles at the European Athletics Championships
2006 in women's athletics